Donna R. Perry (born Douglas R. Perry) is an American serial killer. Born male, she was charged with three counts of first-degree murder in 2014 for killing three women in 1990. Perry underwent gender reassignment surgery in 2000; her gender identity formed a portion of the defense's argument.

Early life 
Perry was abused by her father from age four until her father's death three years later.

Crimes 
Perry's criminal record lists various charges dating back to 1974. In 1987, Perry was charged with reckless endangerment. In 1988, Perry was arrested for possessing a pipe bomb and was subsequently found to have 49 guns and 20,000 rounds of ammunition. In 1989, Perry was arrested for soliciting a prostitute. In the late 1990s, Perry spent 18 months in jail after being pulled over in Oregon's red light district with a gun and knife. During this prison sentence, Perry allegedly confessed to her cellmate to killing nine prostitutes.

Perry shot and killed Yolanda A. Sapp (26), Nickie I. Lowe (34), and Kathleen A. Brisbois (38) during a four-month period in 1990. Sapp's body was discovered on February 22, Lowe's on March 25, and Brisbois' on May 15. The women were all found naked near the Spokane River, where they were dumped. Until 2012, they were believed to be additional victims of convicted serial killer, Robert L. Yates.

Trial and imprisonment 
In March 2012, Perry was convicted for firearms possession. As part of the legal process, her DNA was submitted to a national database, which matched it to DNA relating to the 1990 murders. In a 2012 affidavit, Perry recounted her experience post-gender-confirmation, which she underwent in 2000 in Thailand. Perry claimed she underwent the surgery "as a permanent way to control violence".

In 2014, Perry was charged with three counts of first-degree murder. Perry was originally to stand trial in 2016. However, due to an ethics breach in the Spokane County Public Defender's Office, attorneys Kyle Zeller, Nathan Poston and Brooke Hagara resigned in April of that year, forcing the trial to be postponed.

The trial began on June 9, 2017. The prosecution cited DNA and fingerprint evidence in connection to the three killings. A portion of Perry's defence rested on her claim that it was Douglas Perry, not Donna, who may have committed the murders. The prosecution argued, contrarily, that Perry underwent reassignment surgery in order to avoid suspicion in the killings. Perry's defense attorney Pat Donahue argued the DNA evidence only proved that Perry was in the area where the crimes took place.

On July 24, 2017, Perry was sentenced to three life sentences without the possibility of parole. She is currently detained at the Washington Corrections Center for Women in Gig Harbor, Washington. The family of Nickie Lowe expressed their desire for Perry to serve her sentence in a men's prison or in isolation to prevent possible harm to more women.

Media 
In 2019, Perry was the focus of an episode of 21st Century Serial Killer. Episode 5 of season 2 of Inside the Mind of a Serial Killer, "Douglas Perry", centred on Perry's crimes. Season 2, Episode 10, "Full Circle", of Forensic Files II deals with Perry's crimes and victims.

References 

1990 murders in the United States
American people convicted of murder
American serial killers
Date of birth missing (living people)
Living people
Transgender women
Year of birth missing (living people)